António de Amaral de Meneses was the 19th and last Governor of Portuguese Ceylon. de Meneses was appointed in 1656 under John IV of Portugal, remaining Governor until 1658.

References

Governors of Portuguese Ceylon
16th-century Portuguese people